The 1990–91 Belgian Cup was the 36th season of the main knockout competition in Belgian association football, the Belgian Cup.

Final rounds
The final phase started when all clubs from the top two divisions in Belgian football entered the competition in the round of 64 (18 clubs from first division, 16 clubs from second division and 30 clubs from the qualifications). The first 3 rounds were played in one leg, while the next 2 rounds (quarter-finals and semifinals) were played in two legs. The final game was played at the Heysel Stadium between Club Brugge and KV Mechelen, Club Brugge winning 3-1.

Bracket

* after extra time

References

Belgian Cup seasons
Cup